Petr Korda was the defending champion but lost in the quarterfinals to Sergi Bruguera.

Jim Courier won in the final 7–5, 6–7(5–7), 6–2 against Tim Henman.

Seeds

  Thomas Muster (quarterfinals)
  Thomas Enqvist (first round)
  Jan Siemerink (first round)
  Michael Stich (first round)
  Magnus Gustafsson (quarterfinals)
  Petr Korda (quarterfinals)
  Paul Haarhuis (first round)
  Jim Courier (champion)

Draw

Finals

Top half

Bottom half

External links
 1997 Qatar Open draw

1997 Qatar Open
1997 ATP Tour